The 2015 Dockerty Cup was a football (soccer) knockout-cup competition held between men's clubs in Victoria, Australia in 2015, the annual edition of the Dockerty Cup.  Victorian soccer clubs from the 5 State League Divisions, regional, metros and masters leagues - plus the 12 Clubs from the National Premier Leagues Victoria - competed for the Dockerty Cup trophy.

This knockout competition was won by South Melbourne, a record 8th title.

The competition also served as  Qualifying Rounds for the 2015 FFA Cup. In addition to the two Victorian A-League clubs, the four semi-finalists qualified for the final rounds of the 2015 FFA Cup, entering at the Round of 32.

Format

Preliminary rounds

Victorian clubs, participate in the 2015 FFA Cup via the preliminary rounds. This was open to teams from the National Premier Leagues Victoria, Victorian State League divisions, regional and metros leagues. Teams were seeded in terms of which round they would enter based on their Division in 2015, which are shown in the table for the team's tier.

A total of 191 clubs entered into the competition (one greater than the previous year), and the four qualifiers for the semi-final rounds are:

Semi finals
A total of four teams took part in this stage of the competition. The draw was held on 26 June, with the matches played on 15–16 July.

Final
The Final was played at South Melbourne's home ground of Lakeside Stadium on 2 August. Miloš Lujić was named man-of-the-match and received the Jimmy Mackay Medal.

External links
FFV Website: Football Federation Victoria

References

Dockerty Cup